In enzymology, an oximinotransferase is an enzyme that catalyzes the chemical reaction

pyruvate oxime + acetone  pyruvate + acetone oxime

Thus, the two substrates of this enzyme are pyruvate oxime and acetone, whereas its two products are pyruvate and acetone oxime.

This enzyme belongs to the family of transferases, specifically those transferring nitrogenous groups oximinotransferases.  The systematic name of this enzyme class is pyruvate-oxime:acetone oximinotransferase. Other names in common use include transoximinase, oximase, pyruvate-acetone oximinotransferase, and transoximase.

References

 
 
 

EC 2.6.3
Enzymes of unknown structure